Claire Harris (born 13 June 1937 in Port of Spain, Trinidad, died 5 February 2018) was a Canadian poet who lived in Calgary, Alberta. Harris' numerous works explore themes such as mortality, the role and treatment of women of color in society, and the search for identity. Harris attended university in both Dublin and Jamaica, earning a Bachelor of Arts in English and a post-graduate diploma. She immigrated to Canada in 1966, working as a high school English teacher before publishing her first poetry book in 1984. After this, Harris published six books, as well as co-authoring two more and editing another. Her work has earned her numerous awards; her 1992 collection, Drawing Down a Daughter, was nominated for a Governor General's Award. In Calgary, Harris got involved working as a poetry editor for Dandelion Magazine from 1981-1989. She had also spread psychological struggles and issues with women experienced by women of Color and women in general.

Bibliography
 1984 Fables from the Women's Quarters 
 1984 Translation into Fiction 
 1986 Travelling to Find a Remedy 
 1989 The Conception of Winter 
 1992 Drawing Down a Daughter
 1992 Kitchen Talk: An Anthology of Writings by Canadian Women (Editor with Edna Alford)
 1995 Grammar of Dissent: Poetry and Prose (With Dionne Brand and M. NourbeSe Philip)
 1996 Dipped in Shadow 
 1999 Demon Slayers (Co-Author with Paul Hollis) 
 2000 She

References

1937 births
2018 deaths
20th-century Canadian poets
Canadian women poets
20th-century Canadian women writers
Writers from Calgary
People from Port of Spain